Sathish Kalathil is an Indian film and documentary director and producer in Malayalam. He is also story writer, and lyricist. His experimental works are well known and appropriately discussed in Malayalam Cinema industry and his debut movie Jalachhayam (2010) was well discussed according to its experimental approach. His first film was Veenavaadanam (2008), an experimental documentary about art (painting). In 2012, he directed Laloorinu Parayanullathu, a social committed documentary film about municipal solid waste.

Personal life
Sathish was born to K. P. Sankaran and K. M. Komalam at Sankarayya Road, Poothole P.O in Thrissur district of Kerala, India. He completed his primary education from Namboodiri Vidyalayam UP school and Vivekodayam Boys Higher Secondary School nearby Thrissur town. In teenage, he was a Newspaper agent of Mangalam daily, when it was launched. Years later, he became an auto rickshaw driver. During his movie Jalachhayam, he was a fast food business man. Now, he is also a political leader of Nationalist Congress Party with the post secretary of Nationalist Labour Congress, Kerala, a Labour wing of N.C.P and state organizing secretary of Kerala Vazhi Vanibha Sabha (H.M.S) union. He is married to Rema K.P and he has three children. Niveda, Navin Krishna, Akhil Krishna. His elder son Navin Krishna played the character of 'Kannan' in Jalachhayam.

Filmography

Direction

Lyrics
Sathish penned the lyrics of the Song 'Varakal vaachala kadhakal, kaalam chollum charithra kadhakal' In Veenavaadanam Documentary and he has published many poems since his teenage under the Pen Name 'Surya'.

Book 

 
After some research about the sufferings and various problems faced by people of Laloor due to the heavy dumping of Municipal Garbage of Thrissur Municipal Corporation at their premises and the associated protest manifested through various forms of strikes, Sathish Kalathil wrote the Principal Story for his documentary Laloorinu Parayanullathu Bhasi Pangil made a Script out of this Story about Laloor.

The Book, 'Laloorinu Parayanullathu (What has Laloor To Say)' Published by Vidyaposhini Publications, Thrissur. And, the book released on 29 August 2013 by Dr.P.V. Krishnan Nair, secretary, Kerala Sangeetha Nataka Akademi and copy received by R. Gopalakrishnan, secretary, Kerala Sahithya Akademi at Prof. Joseph Mundassery Memorial Auditorium, Thissur, associated with D.F.M.F Short Film Festival-2013 contested by Digital Film Makers' Forum Trust .

Career
Sathish started the news magazine Prathibhavam in 2000., He established a trust in 2010, Digital Film Makers Forum (D.F.M.F.), to help amateur digital filmmakers make and promote digital films. Through Digital Film Makers Forum, Sathish Kalathil and his associates organised a digital short film festival, called the D.F.M.F Short Film Festival, in 2013 to promote budding digital short filmmakers. The event resulted in a slew of digital short film festivals in and around Thrissur District and other places in Kerala, which was remarkable considering digital short films had remained obscure up until that time.

He took advantage of various opportunities opened up by the digital era. He was one of the first people around the world to experiment with filmmaking using first generation mobile phones.

References

External links

 
Official Website
D.F.M.F Trust
Prathibhavam Magazine

1971 births
Living people
People from Thrissur district
Malayalam film directors
Malayalam screenwriters
Malayalam-language lyricists
Writers from Thrissur
Malayalam poets
21st-century Indian film directors
20th-century Indian film directors
Film producers from Thrissur
Film directors from Thrissur
Indian documentary film directors
Screenwriters from Kerala
Filmmaking pioneers
Film directors from Kerala